Jack Bill Van Mark (July 4, 1930 – December 23, 2020) was an American politician in the state of Wyoming. He served in the Wyoming House of Representatives as a member of the Republican Party. He earned a Bachelor of Science degree from the University of Wyoming in geology.

References

1930 births
2020 deaths
People from Torrington, Wyoming
Colorado School of Mines alumni
University of Wyoming alumni
Ranchers from Wyoming
Republican Party members of the Wyoming House of Representatives